The Hard Livings gang is a large street gang and organized crime group based in Manenberg, Cape Town.  A number of other smaller gangs form part of the Hard Livings gang and owe allegiance to it.  The Hard Livings used to be one of two 'super gangs' in Cape Town with the other one being The Americans.

The gang was formed in 1971 by Rashied Staggie and his twin brother Rashaad. The gang started out as a criminal street gang mostly involved in drug distribution for which they competed with the Americans gang. After their distribution network grew, the Hard Livings gang as well as their rivals evolved into a structured criminal organization involved in a wide range of criminal activities. In 1996 Rashaad was publicly set alight and killed by the vigilante group PAGAD. In December 2019, Rashied was shot and killed in the same street where Rashaad was killed.

In the 1990s and early 2000s the gang was known to have had a strong presence in the wealthy Green Point and Sea Point areas of Cape Town.

The gang is known to have been involved in both international and local organized crime. Their local activities range from drug running & trading, poaching, protection rackets, prostitution and shebeening (provision of unlicensed drinking places).  Internationally they have been known to have cooperated with the Sicilian mafia in the trafficking of illegal diamonds as well as trafficking Cannabis to Europe.

References

Organizations established in 1971
1971 establishments in South Africa
Gangs in South Africa
Organisations based in Cape Town